The Natrona County School District #1 is a public school district, serving students in Natrona County, Wyoming, USA. Based in Casper, Wyoming, the district also serves the towns and communities of Alcova, Edgerton, Evansville, Midwest, Mills, Powder River, and Willow Creek.

Governance 
The Natrona County School District is governed by a publicly elected board of trustees. Members are elected at-large by county voters to staggered, four-year terms. School elections are held biannually in November.  The school board hires a superintendent to oversee the day-to-day operations of the district. Superintendent Dr. Joel Dvorak was hired in July 2008.

Internally, NCSD operates under a shared governance model called the Compact. Established in 2001 following a round of contentious contract negotiations, the NCSD Compact is an agreement between the Board of Trustees, the Natrona County Education Association (NCEA), the Natrona County Association of Education Support Staff (NCAESS), and the Service Employees Independent Organization (SEIO). The agreement structures decision-making models in the district to assure that all major decisions impacting students, as well as contract and salary/benefit decisions, are made through a consensus process.

Schools

Safety programs 
The Safe Schools Suspension Lab is a program that provides a safe, supervised alternative to at-home suspension for students whose behavior requires them to be removed from the traditional classroom.

In 2009, the school district made national news when it approved an anti-bullying policy that specifically prohibits cyberbullying and sexting.

Schools of choice 
In the early 1990s, the Natrona County School District began establishing Lighthouse Schools. Prior to that time, admission to schools was based on residency boundaries throughout the county. The Board of Trustees began accepting applications to start new schools which would have unique curriculum characteristics and that would be filled outside the boundary system. According to the Casper Star-Tribune, 29 proposals were submitted by parents and teachers. Three were selected to become Lighthouse Schools. They opened in 1991 as the first schools of choice.

The move drove other schools to try to reinvent themselves in an effort to draw students. By 1996, the Board of Trustees repealed its attendance boundaries, citing the number of choices in the district. The new practice allows all families to select from the full list of public schools in the district.

The board also established a transportation policy that developed a hub-based busing system. This system provides students with transportation from their neighborhoods to their schools throughout the district.

Today, the open enrollment system continues, though some changes have been made. As population increases and some schools’ popularity increases, the district has developed a policy to determine which students have preference in over-filled schools. Admission continues to be available at any school on a space-available basis.

Some community members have turned away from the open enrollment policy, pushing to return to a boundary system and "neighborhood schools." This issue has been at the forefront of modern school board discussions and continues to be a pressing issue for the community.

High access technology 
NCSD has committed to providing students with high access to technology. The first high-access school in the district was Frontier Middle School, which opened in 2006, providing laptop computers to every student for school and home use. The high-access environments have spread to several other schools, where students and staff members check out laptops for use throughout the academic year. Sites with high-access programs as of 2009 include Centennial Junior High School, CY Junior High School, Dean Morgan Junior High School, Kelly Walsh High School, and Natrona County High School.

Capital construction 
School capital construction and major maintenance in Wyoming is funded through the state's School Facilities Commission, which was formed in response to a Wyoming Supreme Court ruling that holds the state responsible for equitable school facilities. Funded primarily through coal royalties, the SFC provides funding to upgrade and replace existing school facilities based on need and to build new facilities based on population.

In the Natrona County School District, this system has led to a number of recent capital construction projects:

 A new facility for Fort Caspar Academy, opened in 2008.
 A remodel of the former Fairdale Elementary School site to provide a new facility for Star Lane Center.
 A remodel of the Central Services Facility to provide space for the Back on Track and Safe Schools Suspension Lab programs.
 A new facility for Cottonwood Elementary School, opened in January 2009.
 A new Poison Spider School facility, opened in Spring 2009.
 A new CY Middle School facility, opened in 2010.
 A new elementary school, opened in 2010.

Secondary systems transformation 
The Natrona County School District transformed its secondary education system and defined a comprehensive secondary education platform which includes grades six through 12.

Work on Natrona County High School and Kelly Walsh High School to expand facilities began in 2014. At NCHS a restoration and remodel of the historic building is planned along with construction of new additions. The KWHS building is being replaced with new construction on the same site. These improvements will accommodate the additional students in the buildings due to switching to 9th-12th grade high schools.

In addition, the district has recognized a need to better serve 21st-century students. District and community officials are concerned about a high drop-out rate throughout the district, as well as a high disengagement rate among students.

Student Demographics
The following figures are as of October 1, 2009.

Total district enrollment: 11,729
Student enrollment by gender
Male: 6,058 (51.65%)
Female: 5,671 (48.35%)
Student enrollment by ethnicity
American Indian or Alaska Native: 119 (1.01%)
Asian: 101 (0.86%)
Black or African American: 219 (1.87%)
Hispanic or Latino: 937 (7.99%)
Native Hawaiian or other Pacific Islander: 9 (0.08%)
Two or more races: 49 (0.42%)
White: 10,295 (87.77%)

References

Other sources 
District aims to facilitate, aid in decisions for parents
Choice came about to avoid 'dumping grounds'
Timeline of choice in Natrona County
Two miles each way
District looks to the future with new high school
District moves ahead on construction

External links 
 Official site

Education in Natrona County, Wyoming
School districts in Wyoming